Debden Park High School is a mixed academy school situated in Loughton. The current headteacher is Helen Gascoyne, and the previous one, being Cristian Cavanagh, was appointed in April 2007, succeeding Michael Moore.

On average, there are 1050 students on roll.

External links 
 http://www.debdenparkhighschool.org/

Academies in Essex
Secondary schools in Essex
Loughton
Educational institutions established in 1999
1999 establishments in England